Jung Hong-Youn (born August 18, 1983) is a South Korean footballer. Since 2014, he has played for Bucheon FC 1995 (formerly Busan I'Park, Jeju United, Pohang Steelers and Chunnam Dragons).

References

 

1983 births
Living people
South Korean footballers
Jeju United FC players
Busan IPark players
Pohang Steelers players
Jeonnam Dragons players
Bucheon FC 1995 players
K League 1 players
K League 2 players
Association football midfielders